Jamides, commonly called ceruleans, is a genus of butterflies in the family Lycaenidae. The species of this genus are found in the Indomalayan realm, the Palearctic realm and the Australasian realm.

Species

Listed alphabetically:
 Jamides abdul (Distant, 1886)
 Jamides aetherialis (Butler, 1884) Moluccas, Raja Ampat Islands,  Schouten Islands, New Guinea, Bismarck  Islands, Solomon Islands
 Jamides alecto (Felder, 1860) – metallic cerulean (Ceylon, southern India, Sikkim, Burma, Malaysia, Ambon, Serang, Obi?, Bachan?, New Guinea)
 Jamides aleuas (C. & R. Felder, [1865])
 Jamides allectus (Grose-Smith, 1894)
 Jamides alsietus (Fruhstorfer, 1916) Philippines
 Jamides amarauge Druce, 1891 – amarauge cerulean (Darnley Island, Papua, New Guinea, West Irian?, Bougainville?, Shortlands, Gudalcanal, Florida Island) 
 Jamides anops (Doherty, 1891) Lesser Sunda Islands
 Jamides aratus (Stoll, [1781])
 Jamides areas (Druce, 1891) Solomon Islands
 Jamides aritai Hayashi, [1977]
 Jamides aruensis (Pagenstecher, 1884)
 Jamides biru (Ribbe, 1926) Celebes
 Jamides bochus (Stoll, [1782]) – dark cerulean
 Jamides butleri (Rothschild, 1915) Obi Islands, Moluccas, Lease Islands, Gorong archipelago, Sula Islands, New Guinea
 Jamides caerulea (Druce, 1873) – royal cerulean (Assam, Burma, Malaya, Borneo, Java)
 Jamides callistus (Röber, 1886) Philippines, Borneo
 Jamides candrenus (Herrich-Schäffer, 1869)
 Jamides carissima (Butler, [1876]) New Hebrides, Loyalty Islands
 Jamides celebica (Eliot, 1969) Sulawesi
 Jamides celeno (Cramer, [1775]) – common cerulean (Sri Lanka, India, Indochina, Malaya, Celebes)
 Jamides cephion Druce, 1891 Solomon Islands
 Jamides cleodus (C. & R. Felder, [1865]) – white cerulean (Assam, Burma)
 Jamides coritus (Guérin-Méneville, 1829)
 Jamides coruscans (Moore, 1877) – Ceylon cerulean (Sri Lanka) 
 Jamides cunilda (Snellen, 1896)
 Jamides cyta (Boisduval, 1832) − pale cerulean
 Jamides elioti Hirowatari & Cassidy, 1994 – Eliot's caerulean (Sulawesi) 
 Jamides elpis (Godart, [1824]) – glistening cerulean (Assam, Indochina, Malaya, Celebes, Timor, Wetar?, Kissar)
 Jamides epilectus (Grose-Smith, 1897) Fergusson Island
 Jamides euchylas (Hübner, [1819]) Seram, Ambon, Saparua, Geser
 Jamides ferrari Evans, 1932 − Ferrar's cerulean
 Jamides festivus (Röber, 1886)
 Jamides fractilinea Tite, 1960 Sulawesi, Sula Island
 Jamides goodenovii (Butler, 1876) Goodenough Island, Woodlark Island
 Jamides halus Takanami, 1994 Sulawesi, Buru
 Jamides kankena (Felder, 1862) – glistening cerulean
 Jamides lacteata (de Nicéville, 1895) – milky cerulean
 Jamides limes (Druce, 1895)
 Jamides lucide de Nicéville, 1894 Sumatra, Borneo
 Jamides lugine (Druce, 1895)
 Jamides malaccanus (Röber, 1886)
 Jamides nemea (Felder, 1860) = Jamides cyta nemea (Felder, 1860)
 Jamides nemophilus (Butler, 1876) New Guinea, Fergusson, Goodenough, Trobriand, Darnley Islands, Bismarck Archipelago, Rook Island
 Jamides nitens (Joicey & Talbot, 1916) New Guinea
 Jamides parasaturatus (Fruhstorfer, 1916)
 Jamides petunia Druce, 1887
 Jamides phaseli (Mathew, 1889)
 Jamides philatus (Snellen, 1878) – Burmese caerulean
 Jamides pseudosias (Rothschild, 1915) Halmahera, Bacan, Obi, Seram, Misool, Ambon, Sulawesi, Sula Islands, New Guinea
 Jamides pulcherrima Butler, 1884 New Hebrides
 Jamides puloensis Tite, 1960 Borneo
 Jamides pura (Moore, 1886) – white cerulean
 Jamides purpurata Grose-Smith, 1894 1894 New Guinea, Manam, Karkar, Fergusson, Tagula Islands
 Jamides reverdini (Fruhstorfer, 1915) New Guinea
 Jamides sabatus (Fruhstorfer, 1916) Philippines
 Jamides schatzi (Röber, 1886) Halmahera, Ternate, Kayoa, Bacan, Sulawesi, Talaud, Sangihe, Philippines
 Jamides seminiger Grose-Smith, 1895 Halmahera, Bacan, Obi, Buru, Seram, Ambon, Sula, Watubela Island, Kei Islands, Aru Islands
 Jamides snelleni (Röber, 1886) – Snellen's cerulean (Celebes)
 Jamides soemias Druce, 1891 Bismarck Archipelago, Bougainville, Shortlands, Florida Island, Malaita, New Britain, Dampier Island, Vulcan Island
 Jamides suidas (C. & R. Felder, [1865]) Philippines
 Jamides talinga (Kheil, 1884)
 Jamides tsukadai Takanami, 1994 Sulawesi
 Jamides uniformis Rothschild, 1915 Admiralty Islands
 Jamides virgulatus (Druce, 1895)
 Jamides walkeri Druce, 1892 1892 "South Pacific Islands", Austral Island
 Jamides yehi Eliot, 1995 Malaya
 Jamides zebra (Druce, 1895)

References

External links

 
Lycaenidae genera
Taxa named by Jacob Hübner